The 2022–23 NCAA Division I women's basketball season began on November 7, 2022. The regular season ended on March 12, 2023, with the 2023 NCAA Division I women's basketball tournament beginning on March 14 and ending with the championship game at American Airlines Center in Dallas on April 2.

Rule changes
The following rule changes will be recommended by the NCAA Basketball Rules Committee to the Playing Rules Oversight Panel for 2022−23 season:

TBD

Season headlines
 June 21, 2022 – Hartford, which started a transition from Division I to Division III in the 2021–22 school year, was announced as a new member of the D-III Commonwealth Coast Conference (CCC) effective in 2023–24. The CCC press release also confirmed previous reports that Hartford would leave the America East Conference after the 2021–22 season; the Hawks will play the 2022–23 season as a D-I independent.
 June 24 – Incarnate Word, which had announced a move from the Southland Conference (SLC) to the Western Athletic Conference (WAC), backed out of this move and elected to remain in the SLC.
 June 30 – The Big Ten Conference announced that UCLA and USC would join from the Pac-12 Conference in 2024, immediately after the current Pac-12 media contracts expire.
 July 11 – The SLC and Lamar jointly announced that Lamar, which had previously planned to leave the WAC in 2023 to return to the SLC, would expedite this move for the 2022–23 school year.
 July 15 – The WAC announced that starting with the 2023 editions, its men's and women's tournaments would be seeded via a set of advanced metrics that it calls the WAC Résumé Seeding System, developed by statistics guru Ken Pomeroy alongside WAC officials. Tournament entry will still be based on conference record.
 August 3
 UConn announced that Paige Bueckers, who had been the consensus national player of the year as a freshman in 2020–21, tore her left ACL in a pickup game on August 1 and would miss the entire 2022–23 season.
 The Colonial Athletic Association announced that Campbell would join from the Big South Conference in 2023.
 August 12 – The Indiana University and Purdue University systems announced that Indiana University–Purdue University Indianapolis will be dissolved in 2024 and replaced by separate IU- and Purdue-affiliated institutions. The current athletic program, the IUPUI Jaguars, will transfer to the new IU Indianapolis.
 August 31 – The Division I Board of Directors adopted a series of changes to transfer rules.
 Transfer windows were adopted for all Division I sports. Student-athletes who wish to be immediately eligible at their next school must enter the NCAA transfer portal within the designated period(s) for their sport. For women's basketball, the window opens on the day after Selection Sunday and runs for 60 days.
 Student-athletes who experience head coaching changes, or those whose athletic aid is reduced, canceled, or not renewed, may transfer outside designated windows without penalty.
 Transferring student-athletes will be guaranteed their financial aid at their next school through graduation.
 September 21 – Houston Baptist University announced it had changed its name to Houston Christian University, effective immediately. The athletic nickname of Huskies was not affected.
 October 14 – Conference USA announced that ASUN Conference member Kennesaw State would join C-USA in 2024.
 October 18 – The Associated Press released its preseason poll. Defending national champion South Carolina was the unanimous #1, marking the Gamecocks' third straight season at the top spot. Other poll highlights:
 For the first time since 2006, UConn was ranked outside the top 5 in the preseason poll, landing at #6.
 Two programs equaled their highest-ever rankings in any AP poll: Iowa (#4) and Virginia Tech (#13).
 Three schools were ranked in the preseason for the first time ever: Creighton (#21), South Dakota State (#23), and Princeton (#24).
 October 25 – The AP released its preseason All-America team. South Carolina's Aliyah Boston and Iowa's Caitlin Clark were unanimous choices, joined on the team by Haley Jones of Stanford, Ashley Joens of Iowa State, Elizabeth Kitley of Virginia Tech, and Aneesah Morrow of DePaul.
 November 2 – ESPN reported that Gonzaga athletic director Chris Standiford and Big 12 Conference commissioner Brett Yormark had met the previous week in the Dallas area regarding a possible Gonzaga move to that conference as a full but non-football member. The report also indicated that Gonzaga had at least some level of talks with the Big East Conference and Pac-12 Conference in the preceding months.
 November 17 – During a meeting in San Francisco, the Regents of the University of California, the governing board of the University of California system, set a date of December 14 for a special meeting to make a final determination on UCLA's planned move to the Big Ten.
 December 14 - The UC Regents approved UCLA's move to the Big Ten. Additionally, conditions were made to mitigate athletes such as investing $12 million in beneficial services including nutritional support and charter flights to reduce travel time.  UCLA must also pay the University of California, Berkeley an additional $2 to $10 million due to the move affecting the latter's athletic program, with the precise total being made once the Pac-12 completes its upcoming media rights deal.
 February 8 – UConn lost 59–52 to Marquette, following an 81–77 loss to top-ranked South Carolina in its previous game. This marked the first time since March 1993 that the Huskies had lost consecutive games.
 February 9 – The Big 12 Conference announced that it had reached an agreement with Oklahoma and Texas that will allow the two schools to leave for the Southeastern Conference in 2024 instead of the originally announced 2025 schedule. Approval by the two schools' governing boards was seen as a formality.
 February 24 – In the first sanctions issued by the NCAA regarding name, image, and likeness opportunities, Miami (FL) was placed on one year of probation and received other minor penalties for its involvement in arranging a meeting between alumnus and booster John Ruiz and twin players and social media stars Haley and Hanna Cavinder, who transferred together from Fresno State before the 2022–23 season. Neither Ruiz nor the Cavinder twins received any direct sanctions.

Milestones and records
 December 21 – Caitlin Clark of Iowa reached 2,000 career points in the 75th game of her college career, a 92–54 win over Dartmouth. This equaled Delaware's Elena Delle Donne for the fastest to 2,000 points by a D-I women's player in the current century.
 January 25 – Taylor Robertson of Oklahoma tied Kelsey Mitchell, who played at Ohio State from 2014–2018, for the most career three-pointers in D-I women's basketball, at 497. While Robertson is playing in her fifth season due to benefiting from the NCAA's COVID-19 eligibility waiver for the 2020–21 season, she reached the mark in two fewer games than Mitchell (137 to 139).
 January 28 – Robertson took sole possession of the record for career three-pointers in Oklahoma's 86–78 loss to Iowa State.
 March 11 – Iowa State's Ashley Joens became the 14th Division I women's player with 3,000 career points, reaching the mark in the Cyclones' 82–72 win over Oklahoma in the Big 12 tournament semifinals.
 March 18 – Villanova's Maddy Siegrist became the fifth Division I women's player with 1,000 points in a season, reaching the mark in the Wildcats' 76–59 win over Cleveland State in the first round of the NCAA tournament.

Conference membership changes
Twenty-six schools joined new conferences or became independents, including five schools from Division II that started transitions to Division I this season and one in the transition process from Division I to Division III.

As noted previously, Incarnate Word backed out of a planned move from the Southland Conference to the Western Athletic Conference, and Lamar, which had planned to make the opposite move in 2023, pushed this move forward to 2022.

The 2022−23 season will be the last for at least 15 Division I schools in their current conferences and will also be Hartford's only season as a D-I independent.

Arenas

New arenas
 Alabama A&M opened the new Alabama A&M Events Center on November 18, losing its first game in the new facility 57–36 to Murray State on November 26.
 Fairfield's former home of Alumni Hall was replaced on-site by the  new Leo D. Mahoney Arena. The Stags' first game in the new facility was a 77–53 win over Stonehill on November 18.
 Georgia State left GSU Sports Arena for the new Georgia State Convocation Center. The opening ceremony for the new arena was on September 15, with the first event taking place the following day. The Panthers' first official game was a 114–31 win over nearby Division III member Agnes Scott on November 7.
 Texas moved from the Frank Erwin Center to the Moody Center. The Longhorns' first event at the new arena was an intrasquad scrimmage on October 26, followed by two exhibitions at home before the first official game, a 68–45 win over Louisiana on November 11.

Arenas of new D-I teams
All five new D-I members in 2022–23 play on their respective campuses.
 Lindenwood plays at Robert F. Hyland Performance Arena.
 Queens plays at Curry Arena.
 Southern Indiana plays at Screaming Eagles Arena.
 Stonehill plays at Merkert Gymnasium.
 Texas A&M–Commerce plays at the Texas A&M–Commerce Field House.

Arenas closing
The following D-I programs plan to open new arenas for the 2023−24 season, or move home games to a pre-existing venue. All will move within their current campuses otherwise indicated.
 Austin Peay will leave the on-campus Winfield Dunn Center for the new F&M Bank Arena in downtown Clarksville, Tennessee after 49 seasons. The new arena was originally planned to open for the 2022–23 season, but was delayed to 2023–24.
Baylor will leave the Ferrell Center for the new Foster Pavilion; the venue is scheduled to open in the fall of 2023 or early 2024. 
Georgia Southern will leave the Hanner Fieldhouse for the new Jack and Ruth Ann Hill Convocation Center; the venue was scheduled to open in the early fall of 2023, but was delayed until 2024-25 season.
Longwood will leave Willett Hall for the new Joan Perry Brock Center; the venue is scheduled to open in Summer 2023.
 St. Francis Brooklyn began closing its Remsen Street campus, including Generoso Pope Athletic Complex, at the end of the 2021–22 school year as part of the college's move to a new campus on Livingston Street in Downtown Brooklyn. Home games will at least temporarily be played about 2 miles (3 km) away at Pratt Institute, as the Livingston Street campus has no basketball venue. The final women's basketball game at Pope Athletic Complex was a 64–59 loss to UMBC on November 20.
 Vermont was originally slated to open the new Tarrant Event Center, the replacement for Patrick Gym, in 2021. However, the new arena has since been placed on indefinite hold. Construction was initially halted by COVID-19. With the Tarrant Center being part of a much larger upgrade of UVM's athletic and recreation facilities, UVM chose to prioritize a new student recreation center. Construction of the Tarrant Center is now being hampered by increased borrowing costs.

Seasonal outlook

The Top 25 from the AP and USA Today Coaching Polls

Pre-season polls

Final polls

Top 10 matchups
Rankings reflect the AP poll Top 25.

Regular season
November 14
No. 5 UConn defeated No. 3 Texas, 83–76 (Harry A. Gampel Pavilion, Storrs, Connecticut)
November 20
No. 5 UConn defeated No. 10 NC State, 91–69 (XL Center, Hartford, Connecticut)
No. 6 Louisville defeated No. 3 Texas, 71–63 (Imperial Arena, Paradise Island, Bahamas)
No. 1 South Carolina defeated No. 2 Stanford, 76–71OT (Maples Pavilion, Stanford, California)
November 27
No. 3 UConn defeated No. 9 Iowa, 86–79 (Phil Knight Legacy, Moda Center, Portland, Oregon)
No. 8 North Carolina defeated No. 5 Iowa State, 73–64 (Phil Knight Invitational, Moda Center, Portland, Oregon) 
December 1
No. 5 Indiana defeated No. 6 North Carolina, 87–63 (ACC–Big Ten Women's Challenge, Simon Skjodt Assembly Hall, Bloomington, Indiana)
December 4
No. 7 Notre Dame defeated No. 3 UConn, 74–60 (Jimmy V Women’s Classic, Purcell Pavilion, Notre Dame, Indiana)
December 18
No. 5 Notre Dame defeated No. 6 Virginia Tech, 63–52 (Cassell Coliseum, Blacksburg, Virginia)
January 12
No. 6 Indiana defeated No. 9 Maryland, 68–61 (Simon Skjodt Assembly Hall, Bloomington, Indiana)
January 13
No. 2 Stanford defeated No. 8 UCLA, 72–59 (Pauley Pavilion, Los Angeles, California)
January 20
No. 4 Stanford defeated No. 8 Utah, 74–62 (Maples Pavilion, Stanford, California)
January 23
No. 10 Iowa defeated No. 2 Ohio State, 83–72 (Value City Arena, Columbus, Ohio)
January 26
No. 6 Indiana defeated No. 2 Ohio State, 78–65 (Simon Skjodt Assembly Hall, Bloomington, Indiana)
January 29
No. 9 Utah defeated No. 8 UCLA, 71–69 (Jon M. Huntsman Center, Salt Lake City, Utah)
February 2
No. 6 Iowa defeated No. 8 Maryland, 96–82 (Carver-Hawkeye Arena, Ames, Iowa)
February 5
No. 1 South Carolina defeated No. 5 UConn, 81–77 (XL Center, Hartford, Connecticut)
No. 8 Maryland defeated No. 10 Ohio State, 90–54 (Xfinity Center, College Park, Maryland)
February 9
No. 2 Indiana defeated No. 5 Iowa, 87–78 (Simon Skjodt Assembly Hall, Bloomington, Indiana)
February 12
No. 1 South Carolina defeated No. 3 LSU, 88–64 (Colonial Life Arena, Columbia, South Carolina)
February 21
No. 7 Maryland defeated No. 6 Iowa, 96–68 (Xfinity Center, College Park, Maryland)
February 25
No. 8 Utah defeated No. 3 Stanford, 84–78 (Jon M. Huntsman Center, Salt Lake City, Utah)
February 26
No. 6 Iowa defeated No. 2 Indiana, 86–85 (Carver-Hawkeye Arena, Iowa City, Iowa)
March 4
No. 7 Iowa defeated No. 5 Maryland, 89–84 (2023 Big Ten women's basketball tournament, Target Center, Minneapolis, Minnesota)
March 6
No. 7 UConn defeated No. 10 Villanova, 67–56 (2023 Big East women's basketball tournament, Mohegan Sun Arena, Uncasville, Connecticut)

Postseason

Regular season

Early season tournaments

Upsets
An upset is a victory by an underdog team. In the context of NCAA Division I women's basketball, this generally constitutes an unranked team defeating a team currently 
ranked in the top 25. This list will highlight those upsets of ranked teams by unranked teams as well as upsets of No. 1 teams. Rankings are from the AP poll. Bold type indicates winning teams in "true road games"—i.e., those played on an opponent's home court (including secondary homes).

In addition to the upsets in which an unranked team defeated a ranked team, this list includes non–Division I teams to defeat Division I teams. Bold type indicates winning teams in "true road games"—i.e., those played on an opponent's home court (including secondary homes).

Conference winners and tournaments
Each of the 32 Division I athletic conferences will end its regular season with  a single-elimination tournament. The team with the best regular-season record in each conference receives the number one seed in each tournament, with tiebreakers used as needed in the case of ties for the top seeding. Unless otherwise noted, the winners of these tournaments will receive automatic invitations to the 2023 NCAA Division I women's basketball tournament.

Postseason

Tournament upsets

Final Four – American Airlines Center, Dallas, Texas

National Invitation tournament

Women's Basketball Invitational

This season saw the debut of a third national postseason tournament in the Women's Basketball Invitational, a 16-team affair with all games played on home courts.

Conference standings

Award winners

All-America teams

The NCAA has never recognized a consensus All-America team in women's basketball. This differs from the practice in men's basketball, in which the NCAA uses a combination of selections by the Associated Press (AP), the National Association of Basketball Coaches (NABC), the Sporting News, and the United States Basketball Writers Association (USBWA) to determine a consensus All-America team. The selection of a consensus team is possible because all four organizations select at least a first and second team, with only the USBWA not selecting a third team.
 
Before the 2017–18 season, it was impossible for a consensus women's All-America team to be determined because the AP had been the only body that divided its women's selections into separate teams. The USBWA first named separate teams in 2017–18. The women's counterpart to the NABC, the Women's Basketball Coaches Association (WBCA), continues the USBWA's former practice of selecting a single 10-member (plus ties) team. The NCAA does not recognize Sporting News as an All-America selector in women's basketball.

Major player of the year awards
Wooden Award: 
Naismith Award: 
Associated Press Player of the Year: 
Wade Trophy: 
Ann Meyers Drysdale Women's Player of the Year (USBWA):

Major freshman of the year awards
Tamika Catchings Award (USBWA): 
 WBCA Freshman of the Year:

Major coach of the year awards
Associated Press Coach of the Year: 
Naismith College Coach of the Year: 
 USBWA National Coach of the Year: 
WBCA National Coach of the Year: 
 WBCA Assistant Coach of the Year:

Other major awards
 Naismith Starting Five: 
 Nancy Lieberman Award (top point guard): 
 Ann Meyers Drysdale Award (top shooting guard): 
 Cheryl Miller Award (top small forward): 
 Katrina McClain Award (top power forward): 
 Lisa Leslie Award (top center): 
 WBCA Defensive Player of the Year: 
 Naismith Women's Defensive Player of the Year: 
 Becky Hammon Mid-Major Player of the Year Award: 
Maggie Dixon Award (top rookie head coach): 
Academic All-American of the Year (top scholar-athlete): Caitlin Clark, Iowa
Elite 90 Award (top GPA among upperclass players at Final Four): 
Pat Summitt Most Courageous Award: Angelique Francis, Little Rock

Coaching changes
Many teams will change coaches during the season and after it ends.

See also
2022–23 NCAA Division I men's basketball season

Notes

References